Hyalea boliviensis is a moth in the family Crambidae. It was described by Paul Dognin in 1905. It is found in Bolivia.

References

Moths described in 1905
Pyraustinae